Dizaj-e Batchi (also Romanized as Dīzaj-e Baţchī; also known as Dīzaj, Dīzaj-e Pasak, Dīzaj Pasak, and Dīzeh) is a village in Firuraq Rural District, in the Central District of Khoy County, West Azerbaijan Province, Iran. At the 2006 census, its population was 173, in 46 families.

References 

Populated places in Khoy County